The men's team sprint race of the 2015–16 ISU Speed Skating World Cup 4, arranged in the Thialf arena in Heerenveen, Netherlands, was held on 11 December 2015.

The Canadian team won the race, with the Russian team in second place, and the Dutch team in third.

Results
The race took place on Friday, 11 December, in the evening session, scheduled at 19:29.

Note: NR = national record.

References

Men team sprint
4